Dutch Flat (also, Dutchman's Flat, Dutch Charlie's Flat, and Charley's Flat) is a small unincorporated community and census-designated place (CDP) in Placer County, California, United States, about  northeast of Auburn along Interstate 80. It was founded by German immigrants in 1851 and was once one of the richest gold mining locations in California. Dutch Flat is now registered as a California Historical Landmark.

The community's ZIP code is 95714 and its area code 530.

History
Dutch Flat was founded by two German brothers, Joseph and Charles Dornbach who settled there in 1851 during the California Gold Rush.

To the south of their settlement was the busy mining camp of Green Valley, where 2,000 men were at work when the Dornbachs arrived. Across the Bear River in Nevada County was another camp, Little York, and just west, a trading post at Cold Springs (later known as Gold Run). All these camps were supplied by mule train from Illinoistown, near today's Colfax. Mules drivers referred to the Dornbach's camp as 'Dutch Charlie's Flat,' and thus the town was named.  During this period many Germans were referred as 'Dutch' as a shorthand for Deutschland.  In the 1870s an attempt was made to change the name to 'German Level'.

The Dutch Flat post office opened in 1856.

Travel Center
While Dutch Flat was originally settled by miners, it first gained prominence as an important stagecoach stop, making it one of the largest and most important towns in Placer County from about 1864 to 1866. In the fall of 1866, however, the railroad had reached Cisco,  further up the ridge, and Dutch Flat lost most of its importance as a stage stop.

In 1859 Dr. Daniel Strong of Dutch Flat invited railroad surveyor (later, chief engineer of the Central Pacific Railroad) Theodore Judah to come and evaluate a possible route across the Sierra Nevada mountains. One of the first large mining ditches to reach Dutch Flat had, in effect, demonstrated the existence of easy grades up to Emigrant Gap; from there, the line of the old Donner Trail across the Sierra Nevada was also such that a railroad could be built. Judah argued vociferously for the Central Pacific's financial backers—including California's "Big Four": Leland Stanford, Collis P. Huntington, Mark Hopkins, and Charles Crocker—to employ the route for a trans-Sierra route that would link up to existing Union Pacific service in Utah or Nevada, instead of Huntington's less-ambitious plan to cater to the lucrative stage and wagon-hauled freight between Sacramento and the Comstock mining boom by building a well-surfaced toll road from Dutch Flat to Donner Lake, and then onward to the Carson Valley.

Judah may have been the most vocal critic of the Dutch Flat-Donner Pass Wagon Road, but he wasn't the only opponent. San Francisco investors, Sierra miners, and even the general public believed that the Central Pacific Railroad was focused only on getting their line built to Dutch Flat. Other Californians believed the whole railroad construction project a scam and that no one, not even "Crazy Judah," had ever really figured out a practicable route through the Sierra range.

The perception of greed and avarice raised the ire of many. San Francisco newspapers boldly accused the Central Pacific of planning only to lay track up to Dutch Flat and no further. Numerous articles and pamphlets arguing against the "Great Dutch Flat Swindle!" flooded the press. San Francisco's Alta California editorialized, "The Sacramentans Big Four are determined to have no railroad but Dutch Flat. The Capital City has aided in the raid upon this county for $80,000, upon Placer County for $25,000, and upon the state for millions. There will never be a railroad via Dutch Flat to Nevada Territory. There are obstacles which cannot be overcome. The Pacific Railroad will follow another route, not through Sacramento or anywhere else in the vicinity."

Despite the intense backlash, there was never any foundation to the stories spread by detractors of the Central Pacific Railroad. Obviously, there was no doubt among the Big Four that the Central Pacific line would eventually connect with the Union Pacific somewhere in Utah or the Nevada territory.

Mining

Mining operations at Dutch Flat reached their peak during the 1870s, with thousands of miners working the surrounding area. Prior to the 1870s, gold mining was often a solitary and small-scale pursuit. In 1872, however, the Cedar Creek Company of London purchased over 30 claims in the area and began working them in a more aggressive and industrial fashion, employing hydraulic mining to reach hitherto unreachable deposits of gold by literally blasting it out of alluvial deposits with high-pressure water cannons known as “monitors.” The many dozens of mining claims dividing the old channel gravels beside Dutch Flat and Gold Run made for a thriving economy. In January 1884, however, in a historic verdict, a United States District Court banned the flushing of debris into streams. Implementing the decision was difficult, as many miners refused to accept the court decision. Court challenges were filed, injunctions were disobeyed, inspectors were threatened with violence, but eventually hydraulic operations were brought to an end.

Lumber
Lumber was a prominent industry in Dutch Flat's history.

Chinatown
Dutch Flat's Chinatown began in the 1850s, and by the late 1860s, when the transcontinental railroad was under construction, it was one of the largest Chinese settlements outside of San Francisco. In 1853, Dutch Flat had a population of 6,000 including 3,500 Chinese. In 1877 Old Chinatown burned down, and the settlement relocated south of town, near the Dutch Flat Depot on the Central Pacific Railroad. Adjoining the pioneer American cemetery just above the town is the Chinese burial grounds.

Culture
In the 19th century, Dutch Flat was referred to by residents as "the Athens of the Foothills." It had a thriving amateur dramatical society and debating society, and Mark Twain lectured at its Opera House. Dutch Flat was also frequently mentioned in works by Bret Harte, including "Muck-A-Muck: A Modern Indian Novel After Cooper."

Present
As of October 2009, Dutch Flat had 333 residents. The town is designated "semi-ghost" and while tourism makes up much of the local economy, many of its current residents are retirees, families and professionals who commute to nearby jobs.

Geography
According to the United States Census Bureau, the CDP covers an area of 0.6 square miles (1.5 km2), all of it land.

Climate
Dutch Flat has a hot-summer Mediterranean climate (Köppen climate classification Csa) that is characterized by cool, wet winters and hot, dry summers. (Köppen climate classification Csa)

Demographics

The 2010 United States Census reported that Dutch Flat had a population of 160. The racial makeup of Dutch Flat was 155 (96.9%) White, 0 (0.0%) African American, 3 (1.9%) Native American, 1 (0.6%) Asian, 0 (0.0%) Pacific Islander, 0 (0.0%) from other races, and 1 (0.6%) from two or more races. Hispanic or Latino of any race were 4 persons (2.5%).

The Census reported that 160 people (100% of the population) lived in households, 0 (0%) lived in non-institutionalized group quarters, and 0 (0%) were institutionalized.

There were 85 households, out of which 13 (15.3%) had children under the age of 18 living in them, 36 (42.4%) were opposite-sex married couples living together, 5 (5.9%) had a female householder with no husband present, 2 (2.4%) had a male householder with no wife present.  There were 5 (5.9%) unmarried opposite-sex partnerships, and 0 (0%) same-sex married couples or partnerships. 37 households (43.5%) were made up of individuals, and 17 (20.0%) had someone living alone who was 65 years of age or older. The average household size was 1.88.  There were 43 families (50.6% of all households); the average family size was 2.60.

The population was spread out, with 19 people (11.9%) under the age of 18, 7 people (4.4%) aged 18 to 24, 25 people (15.6%) aged 25 to 44, 66 people (41.3%) aged 45 to 64, and 43 people (26.9%) who were 65 years of age or older.  The median age was 55.0 years. For every 100 females, there were 122.2 males.  For every 100 females age 18 and over, there were 116.9 males.

The homeowner vacancy rate was 2.9%; the rental vacancy rate was 12.5%.  124 people (77.5% of the population) lived in owner-occupied housing units and 36 people (22.5%) lived in rental housing units.

Tourism

Recently, residents of Dutch Flat have sought to increase tourism by asking the state Department of Transportation for a sign on I-80 saying Dutch Flat is a national historic landmark. The Golden Drift Museum on Main Street is open in summer. Historic buildings of note include the Dutch Flat Hotel (1853), Methodist Church (1861), old Dutch Flat Elementary School (1898), Odd Fellows Building and the Masonic Hall (both pre-1856), and the Dutch Flat Cemetery. Dutch Flat is near all mountain recreation areas and only a short distance from snow and water skiing, fishing, biking, kayaking, gold panning and hiking the abundant mountain trails. The town hosts a parade on the 4th of July.

Literature
Dutch Flat has been mentioned or used as a setting by the following authors:
Mark Twain, who derided Dutch Flat poetry as "smooth and blubbery" in a small piece for the 1864 Californian. He  also noted Dutch Flat as the death place of "George," the subject of his essay "General Washington's Negro Body Servant: A Biographical Sketch."
Bret Harte used Dutch Flat as a location for "Muck-A-Muck: A Modern Indian Novel After Cooper" and for "Wan Lee the Pagan."
M.K. Hobson sets several scenes in 1876 Dutch Flat in her alternate history fantasy novel The Native Star.
Russel Towle "The Dutch Flat Chronicles" is a portrait of Dutch Flat from 1849 to 1906, composed of almost 1,000 newspaper articles, short stories, diary fragments, and poems. These were collected from Dutch Flat's three nineteenth-century newspapers, and many other sources.

References

External links

The Golden Drift Museum
Dutch Flat Community Center
Dutch Flat Chamber of Commerce

Census-designated places in Placer County, California
Mining communities of the California Gold Rush
Populated places established in 1851
1851 establishments in California
Census-designated places in California